The 2004 Alamo Bowl featured the Oklahoma State Cowboys, and the Ohio State Buckeyes.

Ohio State got on the board first, when quarterback Justin Zwick connected with wide receiver Anthony Gonzalez for a 23-yard touchdown pass, and a 7–0 lead. Mike Nugent connected on field goals of 37 and 35 yards in the first quarter as well, as Ohio State built a 13–0 lead over Oklahoma State.

In the second quarter, running back Lydell Ross rushed for a 1-yard touchdown and a 20–0 lead. He finished the game with 12 carries for 99 yards. Nugent connected on his third field goal of the game, this one from 41 yards out, as Ohio State increased its lead to 23–0, before halftime.

In the third quarter, Ted Ginn Jr. rushed five yards for a touchdown, increasing Ohio State's lead to 30–0. Nugent kicked his final field goal in the fourth quarter, a 37 yarder to give Ohio State a 33–0 lead. Shaun Willis rushed for a 4-yard touchdown at the end of the game, to make the final score 33–7.

Five days after the game, Oklahoma State coach Les Miles left the Cowboys to become the coach of the LSU Tigers, succeeding Nick Saban. Offensive coordinator Mike Gundy was promoted to succeed Miles. Gundy continues to hold the position through 2022.

References

External links
 Review of game by USA Today

Alamo Bowl
Alamo Bowl
Oklahoma State Cowboys football bowl games
Ohio State Buckeyes football bowl games
Alamo Bowl
December 2004 sports events in the United States